is a Japan-based electronic commerce and Internet company with a diversified group of businesses that includes online shopping, eikaiwa, and video on demand service. The company manages DMM.com, an online entertainment site that allows users to purchase goods and services like e-books, games, mainstream DVD releases, and 3D printing. Its subsidiary DMM.com Securities is the world's second largest forex company in terms of trading volume. As of December 2021, DMM.com had over 35 million registered users.

Outline
DMM.com's core business areas include online shopping, rental service and video on demand service. Rental services cover products from CD/DVD to clothes and house wares. Another key business of the company, video on demand service, offers a selection of anime, movies, drama and other online streaming options. Other services provided include solar panel services, charity auctions, online games, online English education service, and 3D printing. Its subsidiary company DMM.com Securities provides forex service to individual investors.

Milestones

1999 
 Keishi Kameyama founded Digital Media Mart Co., Ltd. on 17 November

2002 
 Relocation of headquarter from Shibuya to Ebisu
 Launched of corporate website – “DMM” with provision of online shopping and video on demand service

2003 
 Renamed the website as “DMM.com” and launched DVD rental service in April
 Established the site “DMM.com” for video on demand service, online games and e-books on 4 July

2004 
 Started monthly subscription video streaming service and e-book service

2005 
 Extended the products for rental service to CD and comic

2006 
 Aired the first TV commercial
 The company reached 500,000 members in March

2007 
 The company further grew over 1 million members in June

2008 
 Released DMM.TV service in July

2009 
 Debuted monthly subscription video streaming service for AKB48 LIVE!! ON DEMAND in February
 Acquired SVC Securities (Predecessor of DMM.com Securities) and entered the forex industry in March
 Established DMMFX in July
 DMM.TV for Blu-ray Disc service in August

2010 
 Further extended the products for rental service to fashion and varieties of goods
 Launched DMM point auction service on 3 August
 Started DMM coupon service on 1 December

2011 
 Renamed Digital Media Mart Co., Ltd. as DMM.com Co., Ltd. on 1 February
 Launched online game service for feature phone in November

2012 
 Launched B2B solar panel business in February which also enable the construction of solar power station
 Launched online game service for smartphones and PCs in April
 Ended DMM.TV for Blu-ray Disc service on 28 September

2013 
 Established online English education service in May
 Launched the printing centre in Japan and started 3D printing service in July

2014 
 Launched VR video streaming service in November, a service which allows user to watch video with 360 degrees panorama
 Established DMM mobile, the MVNO service in December

2015 
 Started DMM.make ROBOTS service in January
 Launched DMM.make cloud sourcing service in February

2016 
 DMM Games entered a partnership with Gaijin Entertainment to assist in the localisation, development and production of War Thunder

2017 
 Became owner of Belgian First Division A club Sint-Truiden.

DMM Games
 Kantai Collection
 
 
 Touken Ranbu
 
 
 Princess Wars
 Jewel Princess
 
 Shiro Project:RE
 Bungo and Alchemist
 
 School Servants!
 
 
 Gemini Seed
 
 Kabaneri of the Iron Castle
 
 Fruits Fulcute!
 Alice Closet
 Ayakashi Rumble!
 Getariki Z
 Djibril – The Devil Angel
 Astel Machina of Hoshisai
 Stationflow
 Mist Train Girls
 Tenkei Paradox
 Monster Musume TD
 Legend Clover
 Magicami
 Otogi Frontier

References

External links 
 (İn Japanese)
 Bloomberg Business profile

Distribution companies based in Tokyo
Retail companies based in Tokyo
Online retailers of Japan
Retail companies established in 1999
Internet properties established in 1999
Japanese companies established in 1999
Internet technology companies of Japan
Video rental services
Mobile game companies
Video game development companies
Video game publishers
Subscription video on demand services
Internet television streaming services
Ebook suppliers